Viridistria is a genus of moths of the family Noctuidae.

Species
Viridistria hollowayi  Behounek & Kononenko, 2012 (Sumatra)
Viridistria secreta  Behounek & Kononenko, 2012 (Vietnam)
Viridistria striatovirens  (Moore, 1883) (India)
Viridistria thoracica (Moore, 1882) (India)
Viridistria viridipicta  (Hampson, 1902) (India)

References
Behounek & Kononenko, 2012: A revision of the "Belciana" viridipicta (Hampson, 1902) species group with description of a new genus and two new species from East Asia (Lepidoptera, Noctuidae: Pantheinae). Revision of Pantheinae, Contribution VII. Zootaxa 3590 37-50. Abstract: .

Pantheinae